Carry You Home refers to:

 Carry You Home (James Blunt song)
 Carry You Home (Zara Larsson song)